Mississippi Hare is a 1949 Looney Tunes cartoon short directed by Chuck Jones and written by Michael Maltese. The short was released on February 26, 1949, and features Bugs Bunny.

Plot
Bugs Bunny, asleep in a cotton field, is picked up by his cottony tail (which a worker mistakes for actual cotton) and bundled into a shipment put on a riverboat going down the Mississippi River (setting sail for Memphis, Vicksburg, Baton Rouge, New Orleans and Cuc-amonga).

After seeing a steward forcibly eject a ticket-less passenger, Bugs acquires some clothes and presents himself to the steward as a top-hatted gentleman. His self-assurance so clearly suggests that he belongs on the boat that the steward hesitates to even ask for a ticket, but rather than browbeat him with his presumed superior station, Bugs gives the man a ticket.

At this point Bugs could simply relax and enjoy the unexpected trip, which must eventually take the boat back to its starting point and so allow him to disembark, but he prefers to try seeking out an adversary with whom he can match wits. He finds one in the Yosemite Sam-esque Colonel Shuffle, a neurotic riverboat gambler. After Shuffle's gunplay clears out the customer base in the casino when another player tops his hand of three Queens with one of four Kings, Bugs remains as his only challenger in a poker game. Beginning with a hundred dollar stake (which amounts to only half a white coin), Bugs soon wins all of Shuffle's money including the original white half coin when he tops the cheating Shuffle's hand of five Aces with six Aces. Literally beaten at his own game, Shuffle challenges Bugs to a pistol duel, with Bugs stepping backwards in lockstep with Shuffle (likely because he thinks Shuffle will cheat), resulting in Shuffle getting a kiss and an exploding cigar from Bugs, leaving Shuffle in blackface and Bugs leads him in a dance to "De Camptown Races" off the ship into the river.

Shuffle is casually lifted back onto the ship by its paddle wheel, and he comes up behind the laughing Bugs (casually asking "Why for did you splash me in the Mississippi mud?") and makes a failed attempt to shoot Bugs with a waterlogged pistol (the bullet, sporting a sail, simply falls out along with the water flow). After Shuffle grabs a dry pistol, Bugs then tricks him into buying a ticket to see "Uncle Tom's Cabin", only for Shuffle to fall back into the river. After getting lifted back on the ship by its paddle wheel again, Shuffle again tries to shoot Bugs (asking "Why did you dunk my poor old hide in Ol' Man River, when I bought a loge seat?"), only to be reminded, "Ah, ah, doc! It's full of water!" Shuffle points the pistol at himself, only to get blasted in the face. Shuffle chases Bugs down to the boiler room, only to end up in the boiler himself and get set on fire, and thus having no other option than as to get change from Bugs for a cup to get water, only to shoot at Bugs when he puts out his fire.

Bugs dons southern belle garb and beats up Shuffle with an umbrella, with Shuffle frantically apologizing until he recognizes Bugs after the rabbit's hat falls off, and the chase resumes. Still in the belle garb, Bugs appeals to another passenger to rescue "her" from Shuffle, whom the passenger throws overboard. However, after realizing that the "lady" he has assisted is a rabbit (the back part of Bugs' dress got ripped off), the dumbfounded man has a nervous breakdown and steps overboard himself. Bugs, unfazed, simply comments "Ah well, we almost had a romantic ending" as the cartoon ends.

References

External links

 

1949 films
1949 short films
1949 animated films
1940s Warner Bros. animated short films
Short films directed by Chuck Jones
Films set in Mississippi
Looney Tunes shorts
Films scored by Carl Stalling
Animated films about rabbits and hares
Bugs Bunny films
Films with screenplays by Michael Maltese
Films set on boats
1940s English-language films